Sivaporn Ratanapool (born 17 March 1954) is a former Thai cyclist. He competed in the individual road race and team time trial events at the 1972 Summer Olympics.

References

External links
 

1954 births
Living people
Sivaporn Ratanapool
Sivaporn Ratanapool
Cyclists at the 1972 Summer Olympics
Place of birth missing (living people)